The 1855 Bursa earthquake occurred on 28 February, with an estimated magnitude of 7.02±0.64  A devastating precursor quake that took place in Mustafakemalpaşa, a town of Bursa Province, in Turkey caused severe destruction all over Bursa and other neighboring cities. 300 people died and thousands of homes and workplaces were wrecked, and some of the historical monuments and buildings including mosques collapsed. Subsequently, fire spread out in the city, which increased the death toll.

On 11 April 1855, an aftershock of the 28 February earthquake was recorded as  6.65±0.33. This aftershock affected the region from Gemlik to Mudanya. 1,300 people died. Gökmen-zâde Seyyid el-Hâcî Hüseyin Rıfat Efendî Bursavî wrote about these earthquakes in his book İşaret-numa, written in the Ottoman Turkish language.

See also
List of earthquakes in Turkey
List of historical earthquakes

References

1855 Bursa
1855 earthquakes
1855
1855 in the Ottoman Empire
February 1855 events
1855 disasters in the Ottoman Empire